Aïn Arnat (in Arabic : عين أرنات) is a town and commune in Sétif Province in north-eastern Algeria.

Geography 
Aïn Arnat is located 7 km west of the city of Sétif and 293 km from the capital Algiers. The Aïn Arnat District has four communes which are Aïn Arnat, Aïn Abessa, El Ouricia and Mezloug.
Bordered by Ain Abessa commune from the north, Mezloug from the south, Sétif from the east
and by Bordj Bou Arréridj Province from the west.

Demography 
The total population of Aïn Arnat was evaluated at 43 551 inhabitants in 2008
with a density of 215 inhabitants/km2.

Education 
Aïn Arnat district has two high schools and four middle schools,
And more than 12 Primary schools
People who graduate mostly go afterwards to University Ferhat Abbas or University Mohamed Lamine Debaghine in Setif.

Climate 

Ain arnat has a Dry Mediterranean climate (Köppen climate classification Csa), its summer is hot and dry, whilst its winter is cool and moist.

Flash floods are rare but have recently occurred around the spring and fall seasons. The summer is fairly hot where extreme heat waves are common around the month of July where temperatures can sometimes even reach .

Transportation

Aïn Arnat has the main and only Airport in Sétif which is Ain Arnat Airport or Sétif International Airport 
Adding to that The National road N°5 which passes by it, and that makes it one of the most important communes in the wilaya of Sétif.

Notes and references

Communes of Sétif Province
Cities in Algeria